Wyndham Lewis may refer to:

Percy Wyndham Lewis (1882–1957), English artist and writer
Wyndham Lewis (politician), MP whose widow married Disraeli
D. B. Wyndham Lewis, humorist and biographer